Loxoconchidae is a family of ostracods belonging to the order Podocopida.

Genera

Genera:
 Alataconcha Whatley & Zhao
 Antarctiloxoconcha Hartmann, 1986
 Australoloxoconcha Hartmann, 1974

References

Ostracods